Rock & Rule (known as Ring of Power outside North America) is a 1983 Canadian adult animated musical science fantasy film featuring the voices of Don Francks, Greg Salata and Susan Roman. It was produced and directed by Michael Hirsh, Patrick Loubert, and Clive A. Smith with John Halfpenny, Patrick Loubert, and Peter Sauder at the helm of its screenplay.

Centering upon rock and roll music, Rock & Rule includes songs by Cheap Trick, Chris Stein and Debbie Harry of the pop group Blondie, Lou Reed, Iggy Pop, and Earth, Wind & Fire. The story takes place in a post-apocalyptic United States populated by mutant humanoid animals. The film was released on April 15 by United Artists, distributed by MGM/UA Entertainment Company and produced by Nelvana Limited. It grossed US$30,379 in the U.S. and Canada.

Plot
In the American release, an introduction states that a war had destroyed the human race, leading to the creation of mutant humanoid animals.

Mok, an aging yet legendary rock musician, is on the search for a very special voice whose frequencies can unleash a powerful demon from another dimension, his dwindling popularity driving him to destroy the world in vengeance and immortalize himself in the process. After travelling around the world looking for the right voice, he returns to his hometown of Ohmtown, a remote, storm-ravaged village famous for its unique power plant. Meanwhile, at a nightclub, Omar, Angel, Dizzy and Stretch perform in a small rock band. As Angel performs her romantic ballad to a mostly empty audience, Mok hears her sing; he realizes that Angel has the voice he needs when a ring he is wearing reacts to her voice. Mok invites Angel and the band to his mansion outside of town, where the band is formally introduced to him and his assistants, the "Rollerskating Schlepper Brothers" Toad, Sleazy and Zip. Mok incapacitates Omar and Stretch with hypnotic "Edison Balls" as he takes Angel on a stroll through his garden and tries to convince her to join him. Although Angel is unaware of Mok's true intentions, she refuses to abandon her band. Unwilling to admit defeat, Mok kidnaps her and takes his blimp to Nuke York, where his summoning, disguised as a concert, will be performed.

Following their ejection from Mok's mansion, the band find out what happened to Angel, and they follow the blimp in a stolen police car. Before they reach Nuke York, they are arrested by a border guard. Meanwhile, Angel attempts to escape with the unwitting help of Cinderella, the sister of the Schleppers. While sneaking through the ventilation system, Angel overhears Mok confirming his plans with his computer. At this time, the computer informs Mok that the only way to stop the demon is with "One voice, one heart, one song", but when Mok asks who can do this, the computer replies that there is "no one". Angel and Cindy escape the building and head to the zero-gravity dance club "Club 666", unaware that the Schleppers are following them. Dizzy's aunt bails out Omar and his friends, and tells them of the club. Angel and Cindy are intercepted and taken back to Mok's apartment, and the band tries to follow. Omar eventually bumps into Mok, who uses an impersonator to fool Omar into thinking that Angel has fallen for Mok. To manipulate Angel, Mok captures the band and tortures them within a giant Edison Ball to force her to agree with his demands. He also brainwashes them to ensure that they stay out of the way. The Nuke York concert turns out to be a disaster due to a power failure. Because the invocation requires a titanic amount of electricity, Mok relocates the summoning to Ohmtown, whose power plant has enough energy. Meanwhile, one of the Schlepper brothers, Zip, expresses childlike doubts about whether their actions are good or evil, and Mok rudely dismisses both his concerns and his feelings. During the concert, a power surge causes overloads all over the city. The shock also brings Omar and his friends out of their hypnosis.

Dizzy finds a poster advertising Mok and Angel's concert, and Stretch sticks with him to save her. After confessing that Omar saw Mok and Angel together, Dizzy tries to remind him it's all mind games. Omar, still believing Mok's earlier deception, refuses to help Dizzy and Stretch stop the concert. They go without him in a stolen police car, but crash at the concert too late, as Mok forces Angel to sing and open a portal to the demon's dimension. A massive demonic entity emerges from the portal and begins wreaking havoc on all those present, wrecking part of the ceiling and devouring two innocents. But Omar has a change of heart and arrives to free Angel from her electronic shackles before the demon can turn on her. When the demon attacks Omar, Zip sacrifices himself to save Omar's life. Angel tries singing to banish the demon, but her lone voice only pushes him back. But Omar joins in harmony with Angel, and thus the creature is weakened, injured and driven back into its own dimension. Mok is thrown into the portal by Toad, who is avenging Zip's death at the demon's hands. As his attempts to climb out prove futile, he realizes that "no one" did not mean that the demon could not be stopped; it meant instead that "no one voice" could, acting alone; two voices and two hearts singing as one were needed for the counter-spell. Mok then plunges into the portal's depths as it seals itself shut. The audience believes the confrontation to have been part of the concert's theatrics, and the band continues their song in triumph as Mylar, the Ohmtown nightclub manager, announces the band as the new super rock band sensation.

Cast
 Greg Salata voices Omar (animated by Frank Nissen) in the Canadian version.
 Paul Le Mat voices Omar in the American version of the film.
 Robin Zander supplies Omar's singing voice.
 Susan Roman voices Angel (animated by Anne-Marie Bardwell).
 Debbie Harry provides Angel's singing voice.
 Don Francks voices Mok Swagger (animated by Robin Budd).
 Lou Reed provides the singing voice for "My Name is Mok" and "Triumph"; Iggy Pop provides the singing voice for "Pain & Suffering".
 Samantha Langevin is the voice of Mok's computer.
 Dan Hennessey is Dizzy (real name Alphonse) (animated by Charles Bonifacio).
 Greg Duffell voices Stretch and Zip.
 Chris Wiggins is Toad (animated by Chuck Gammage).
 Brent Titcomb voices Sleazy.
 Donny Burns plays first radio announcer and Quadhole (animated by John Celestri).
 Martin Lavut voices second radio announcer and Mylar (animated by John Celestri).
 Catherine Gallant voices Cindy (full name Cinderella) (animated by John Celestri).
 Keith Hampshire voices other computers.
 Melleny Brown plays a Carnegie Hall groupie.
 Anna Bourque voices Edna, Pinball Voice
 Nick Nichols voices a border guard.
 John Halfpenny plays Uncle Mikey.
 Maurice LaMarche plays a sailor.
 Catherine O'Hara plays Aunt Edith (animated by Chuck Gammage).

Production
Rock & Rule was Nelvana's first animated feature film, and it was the first Canadian animated feature to be produced in English (Le Village enchanté, a 1955 production from Quebec, was the country's first, overall). The movie began production in 1978 as a children's film entitled Drats!. Nelvana used $8 million to finance and produce the film." The premise remained the same, centering on a post-apocalyptic rock band composed of fuzzy mutant creatures who evolved from rats after the human race was wiped out. However, instead of wiring her to the soundboard, Mok transformed Angel into a guitar, and literally played her to summon the beast. The crew felt that it would be easier to animate cartoony characters but, as the film evolved, they gradually became more humanistic, and Hollywood acquaintances encouraged them to skew the tone towards an older audience.

The film was produced without a well defined script; so the crew would develop and work on sequences, leaving holes for more layers of the story to be added later.

The cost of production, $8 million in studio resources, nearly put Nelvana out of business. Over 300 Nelvana animators worked on the film.

The animation was of unusually high quality for the era, and the special effects were mostly photographic techniques, as computer graphics were in their infancy. Computers were used to generate only a few images in the film.

Release
Prior to its completion, Rock & Rule was picked up by Hollywood film studio MGM/UA in April 1983. However, they did not care about the animated feature and gave it only an extremely small limited release in theatres. Due to some scenes involving adult themes such as sexuality and profanity, the film was uniquely marketed.

Alternative versions

American
The American distributor, MGM/UA Entertainment Company, disliked Greg Salata, who voiced Omar, and insisted that he would be re-dubbed by an actor with name recognition, along with several edits being made to the film. Paul Le Mat was cast and Omar's obscenities were written out. The prologue was also altered, giving a reason why the characters are part animal. Released through United Artists in April 1983, the revised film was unable to find an audience at the box office. It was this chopped version that quickly found its way to VHS and LaserDisc.

Canadian
The film was initially broadcast on the Canadian Broadcasting Corporation in 1985 (uncut and including parental warnings). In 1988, the Canadian Broadcasting Corporation began airing the original cut, which featured extra footage, a different, clearer audio mix, the original voice of Omar, original shots that had been replaced by alternate footage, and the shot of Zip regaining consciousness at the conclusion.

Home media
Original home video release copies of Rock & Rule are extremely difficult to find. MGM/UA Home Video released the film on VHS in 1984 and again on the LaserDisc format in 1986. Both of these editions soon went out of print. Bootleg copies of the film ended up being sold at comic book conventions, but these copies erroneously listed the film as having been done by Ralph Bakshi. Soon after its demise in the home entertainment market, copies of the film could be acquired only by writing to Nelvana, who charged a fee of $80 to create and send a video copy of the film.

On June 7, 2005, Unearthed Films released the film for the first time on DVD. The first disc includes the theatrical cut and the second disc includes the original cut of the film (though the original print was destroyed in a fire; this was taken from a VHS source) and The Devil and Daniel Mouse, the TV special that was the inspiration for Rock & Rule. Other features were the alternate 'Ring of Power' introduction sequence and a slightly different rough-cut version of the ending. Also included is the trailer for Electric Dragon 80.000 V, a 2001 Japanese film written and directed by Sogo Ishii. On September 28, 2010, a Blu-ray Disc was released by Unearthed Films and has two versions of the film in one disc. Both Unearthed Films releases have since gone out-of-print.

Nelvana uploaded the film to its YouTube channel, Retro Rerun, on November 30, 2019 (which was presented in the American VHS and LaserDisc formats). The upload has since been made private on the website as of April 2022 (which was currently available on Amazon Prime Video after Amazon's acquisition of MGM Holdings on March 17, 2022).

Merchandise
Because of MGM's lack of interest in the film, very little promotion was given. The film was mentioned in an episode of Night Flight, when Lou Reed was interviewed and incorrectly credited as the speaking voice of Mok. Marvel Comics published a comic book adaptation with authentic pictures from the film and its production in Marvel Super Special #25. According to letterer and assistant editor Michael Higgins, the comic sold well despite the film itself having had only a very limited release.

Critical reception
Spin Magazine called Rock and Rule "the greatest oddball scifi musical ever committed to animation cels".

Critic Janet Maslin of The New York Times commented that "The animation ... has an unfortunate way of endowing the male characters with doggy-looking muzzles. In any case, the mood is dopey and loud."

American Film magazine described it as a "nominee for the Instant Midnight Movie Award."

Graham Young of the Birmingham Mail said "The antithesis of Disney, and flawed but ahead of its time, Rock & Rule will surprise and delight anyone whose combined interests include graphic novels, animated films and rock music."

Mike McPadden of Vice wrote that "it's enjoyable on its own merits and potently nostalgic."

Keith Breese of Contact Music described Rock & Rule as "a masterpiece of outré animation and wildly ambitious vision and remains a triumph in animated feature film".

The film has since developed a cult following.

Soundtrack

Songs from Iggy Pop, Lou Reed, Cheap Trick, Debbie Harry and Earth, Wind & Fire feature on the soundtrack.

Presumably, due to the film's limited release and the fact that the artists were under contract to different record labels, a proper album was never issued, although a promotional cassette was given to the press featuring nine songs from the movie. The only songs to be commercially released are three by Cheap Trick, which were issued in their 1996 boxed set Sex, America, Cheap Trick, as well as Earth, Wind and Fire's sole contribution entitled "Dance, Dance, Dance", which was released as a digital single in 2012, and Iggy Pop's "Pain and Suffering", which finally surfaced as a bonus track on the 2019 re-release of his album Zombie Birdhouse (an entirely different recording of the song was included on the album's 1991 reissue). Additionally, Debbie Harry revised the lyrics to "Angel's Song" and retitled it "Maybe for Sure", which was featured on her 1989 album Def, Dumb & Blonde.

Critical reception
LA Weekly called the soundtrack "a mixed bag of rock songs" with the "standout track" being "Earth, Wind & Fire's funky club jam 'Dance, Dance, Dance'". Keith Breese of Contact Music noted that the soundtrack "certainly feels contemporary", with "Debbie Harry's addictive 'Angel Song' as the highlight".

Track listing

See also
 List of animated feature films
 Power pop

References

External links

 
 
 
 

 The Critical Eye: Rock & Rule – A review originally in fps magazine
 A 2-part interview with the creators or Rock & Rule by fps magazine
 part 1
 part 2
 The film's page at fast-rewind.com

1983 films
1983 animated films
Lou Reed
Cheap Trick
1980s musical fantasy films
Debbie Harry
1980s science fiction films
Canadian animated science fiction films
Canadian animated fantasy films
Canadian animated films
Canadian animated feature films
1980s English-language films
1980s French-language films
Films directed by Clive A. Smith
Animated musical films
Animated films about mice
Animated films set in the future
Animated post-apocalyptic films
Animated cyberpunk films
Canadian rock music films
Canadian independent films
Fictional mutants
United Artists films
United Artists animated films
Metro-Goldwyn-Mayer animated films
Metro-Goldwyn-Mayer films
Canadian musical fantasy films
Science fiction musicals
Films adapted into comics
Nelvana films
1983 directorial debut films
English-language Canadian films
1980s Canadian films